BTR–EMS–AKG Janakeeya Vedhi (BTR-EMS-AKG People's Forum) was a political group in the South Indian state of Kerala, a splinter group of Communist Party of India (Marxist). The group was led by expelled CITU-leader V.B. Cheriyan. In 2005 the group merged into the Marxist Communist Party of India (United). In the Lok Sabha elections 2004 BTR–EMS–AKG Janakeeya Vedi had formed a front together with Communist Party of India (Marxist-Leninist) Red Flag.

See also 
 B.T. Ranadive
 E. M. S. Namboodiripad
 A.K. Gopalan
 

Defunct political parties in Kerala
Defunct communist parties in India
Communist Party of India (Marxist) breakaway groups
Political parties disestablished in 2005
Political parties with year of establishment missing
Marxist Communist Party of India (United)